The 2011–12 New Orleans Hornets season was the 10th season of the franchise in the National Basketball Association (NBA). For the first time since the 2004–05 season, Chris Paul was not on the roster as he was traded to the Los Angeles Clippers during the lockout. Paul was supposed be traded to the Los Angeles Lakers but then commissioner David Stern vetoed the trade. The post-Chris Paul era Hornets finished the shortened season with a 21–45 record, last in the Western Conference.

Key dates
June 23: The 2011 NBA draft took place at Prudential Center in Newark, New Jersey.

Draft picks

Roster

Pre-season
Due to the 2011 NBA lockout negotiations, the programmed pre-season schedule, along with the first two weeks of the regular season were scrapped, and a two-game pre-season was set for each team once the lockout concluded.

|- bgcolor="#ccffcc"
| 1
| December 16
| @ Memphis
| 
| Jarrett Jack (24)
| Lance Thomas (8)
| Jarrett Jack (6)
| FedEx Forum11,259
| 1–0
|- bgcolor="ccffcc"
| 2
| December 21
| Memphis
| 
| Chris Kaman (18)
| Quincy Pondexter (12)
| Jarrett Jack (8)
| New Orleans Arena11,895
| 2–0

Regular season

Standings

Record vs. opponents

Game log

|- bgcolor=#cfc
| 1
| December 26
| @ Phoenix
| 
| Eric Gordon (20)
| Emeka Okafor (9)
| Eric Gordon (3)
| US Airways Center17,776
| 1–0
|- bgcolor=#cfc
| 2
| December 28
| Boston
| 
| Jarrett Jack (21)
| Carl Landry (11)
| Jarrett Jack (9)
| New Orleans Arena17,802
| 2–0
|- bgcolor=#fcc
| 3
| December 30
| Phoenix
| 
| Carl Landry (17)
| Emeka Okafor (16)
| Greivis Vásquez (5)
| New Orleans Arena15,790
| 2–1

|- bgcolor=#fcc
| 4
| January 1
| @ Sacramento
| 
| Trevor Ariza (17)
| Chris Kaman (15)
| Jarrett JackGreivis Vásquez (8)
| Power Balance Pavilion13,628
| 2–2
|- bgcolor=#fcc
| 5
| January 2
| @ Utah
| 
| Jarrett Jack (27)
| Jason Smith (8)
| Jarrett Jack (11)
| EnergySolutions Arena19,159
| 2–3
|- bgcolor=#fcc
| 6
| January 4
| Philadelphia
| 
| Eric Gordon (22)
| Chris KamanCarl Landry (8)
| Jarrett Jack (11)
| New Orleans Arena12,387
| 2–4
|- bgcolor=#fcc
| 7
| January 6
| Denver
| 
| Greivis Vásquez (16)
| Chris Kaman (12)
| Jarrett Jack (6)
| New Orleans Arena13,035
| 2–5
|- bgcolor=#fcc
| 8
| January 7
| @ Dallas
| 
| Al-Farouq Aminu (15)
| Al-Farouq Aminu (12)
| Jarrett Jack (5)
| American Airlines Center20,409
| 2–6
|- bgcolor=#cfc
| 9
| January 9
| @ Denver
| 
| Chris Kaman (20)
| Chris KamanEmeka Okafor (7)
| Jarrett Jack (9)
| Pepsi Center14,002
| 3–6
|- bgcolor=#fcc
| 10
| January 11
| Oklahoma City
| 
| Chris KamanCarl Landry (17)
| Chris KamanAl-Farouq Aminu (9)
| Jarrett Jack (8)
| New Orleans Arena13,565
| 3–7
|- bgcolor=#fcc
| 11
| January 13
| Minnesota
| 
| Marco Belinelli (20)
| Emeka Okafor (14)
| Jarrett Jack (9)
| New Orleans Arena14,295
| 3–8
|- bgcolor=#fcc
| 12
| January 14
| @ Memphis
| 
| Jarrett Jack (23)
| Jason Smith (8)
| Greivis Vásquez (6)
| FedExForum14,983
| 3–9
|- bgcolor=#fcc
| 13
| January 16
| Portland
| 
| LaMarcus Aldridge (22)
| Emeka Okafor (10)
| Raymond Felton (12)
| New Orleans Arena
| 3–10
|- bgcolor=#fcc
| 14
| January 18
| Memphis
| 
| Jarrett Jack (27)
| Marc Gasol (12)
| Mike Conley (10)
| New Orleans Arena
| 3–11
|- bgcolor=#fcc
| 15
| January 19
| @ Houston
| 
| Kevin Martin (32)
| Samuel Dalembert (17)
| Kyle Lowry (8)
| Toyota Center
| 3–12
|- bgcolor=#fcc
| 16
| January 21
| Dallas
| 
| Carl Landry (19)
| Emeka Okafor (17)
| Delonte West (6)
| New Orleans Arena
| 3–13
|- bgcolor=#fcc
| 17
| January 23
| San Antonio
| 
| Tim Duncan (28)
| Emeka Okafor (8)
| Tony Parker (17)
| New Orleans Arena
| 3–14
|- bgcolor=#fcc
| 18
| January 25
| @ Oklahoma City
| 
| Kevin Durant (25)
| Emeka Okafor (8)
| James Harden (6)
| Chesapeake Energy Arena
| 3–15
|- bgcolor=#cfc
| 19
| January 27
| Orlando
| 
| Dwight Howard (28)
| Dwight Howard (16)
| Jarrett Jack (9)
| New Orleans Arena
| 4–15
|- bgcolor=#fcc
| 20
| January 29
| Atlanta
| 
| Jeff Teague (24)
| Joe Johnson (9)
| Greivis Vásquez (8)
| New Orleans Arena
| 4–16
|- bgcolor=#fcc
| 21
| January 30
| @ Miami
| 
| LeBron James (22)
| LeBron James (11)
| LeBron James (8)
| American Airlines Arena
| 4–17

|- bgcolor=#fcc
| 22
| February 1
| Phoenix
| 
| Steve Nash (30)
| Marcin Gortat (11)
| Greivis Vásquez (12)
| New Orleans Arena
| 4–18
|- bgcolor=#fcc
| 23
| February 2
| @ San Antonio
| 
| Tim Duncan (19)
| Tim Duncan (9)
| Tony Parker (7)
| AT&T Center
| 4–19
|- bgcolor=#fcc
| 24
| February 4
| @ Detroit
| 
| Trevor Ariza (26)
| Greg Monroe (16
| Greivis Vásquez (9)
| The Palace of Auburn Hills
| 4–20
|- bgcolor=#fcc
| 25
| February 6
| Sacramento
| 
| DeMarcus Cousins (28)
| DeMarcus Cousins (19)
| Greivis Vásquez (9)
| New Orleans Arena
| 4–21
|- bgcolor=#fcc
| 26
| February 8
| Chicago
| 
| Carlos Boozer (18)
| Joakim Noah (10)
| Derrick Rose (6)
| New Orleans Arena
| 4–22
|- bgcolor=#fcc
| 27
| February 10
| Portland
| 
| Jamal Crawford (31)
| Trevor Ariza (9)
| Jamal Crawford (8)
| New Orleans Arena
| 4–23
|- bgcolor=#cfc
| 28
| February 13
| Utah
| 
| Chris Kaman (27)
| Chris Kaman (13)
| Greivis Vásquez (10)
| New Orleans Arena
| 5–23
|- bgcolor=#cfc
| 29
| February 15
| @ Milwaukee
| 
| Ersan İlyasova (23)
| Gustavo Ayon (12)
| Greivis Vásquez (7)
| Bradley Center
| 6–23
|- bgcolor=#cfc
| 30
| February 17
| @ New York
| 
| Amar'e Stoudemire (26)
| Amar'e Stoudemire (12)
| Greivis Vásquez (11)
| Madison Square Garden
| 7–23
|- bgcolor=#fcc
| 31
| February 20
| @ Oklahoma City
| 
| Kevin Durant (31)
| Kendrick Perkins (13)
| Trevor Ariza (5)
| Chesapeake Energy Arena
| 7–24
|- bgcolor=#fcc
| 32
| February 21
| @ Indiana
| 
| Roy Hibbert (30)
| Roy Hibbert (13)
| Jarrett Jack (10)
| Bankers Life Fieldhouse
| 7–25
|- bgcolor=#cfc
| 33
| February 22
| @ Cleveland
| 
| Antawn Jamison (22)
| Gustavo Ayon (17)
| Kyrie Irving (11)
| Quicken Loans Arena
| 8–25
|- bgcolor=#fcc
| 34
| February 28
| @ Chicago
| 
| Derrick Rose (32)
| Joakim Noah (16)
| Derrick Rose (9)
| United Center
| 8–26
|- bgcolor=#fcc
| 35
| February 29
| Toronto
| 
| Linas Kleiza (21)
| Chris Kaman (10)
| Jarrett Jack (6)
| New Orleans Arena
| 8–27

|- bgcolor=#cfc
| 36
| March 2
| Dallas
| 
| Rodrigue Beaubois (25)
| Chris Kaman (13)
| Greivis Vásquez (7)
| New Orleans Arena
| 9–27
|- bgcolor=#fcc
| 37
| March 3
| Indiana
| 
| Jarrett Jack (18)
| Solomon Jones (9)
| Gustavo Ayon (4)
| New Orleans Arena16,379
| 9–28
|- bgcolor=#fcc
| 38
| March 5
| @ Portland
| 
| Marco Belinelli (18)
| Chris Kaman (11)
|  Three players (3)
| Rose Garden20,520
| 9–29
|- bgcolor=#fcc
| 39
| March 7
| @ Sacramento
| 
| Jarrett Jack (25)
| Chris Kaman (11)
| Chris Kaman (8)
| Power Balance Pavilion13,487
| 9–30
|- bgcolor=#fcc
| 40
| March 9
| @ Denver
| 
| Lance Thomas (18)
| Four players (5)
| Greivis Vásquez (8)
| Pepsi Center19,155
| 9–31
|- bgcolor=#cfc
| 41
| March 10
| @ Minnesota
| 
| Chris Kaman (20)
| Al-Farouq AminuChris Kaman (6)
| Jarrett Jack (7)
| Target Center20,123
| 10–31
|- bgcolor=#fcc
| 42
| March 12
| Charlotte
| 
| Jarrett Jack (15)
| Chris Kaman (16)
| Jarrett Jack (9)
| New Orleans Arena15,254
| 10–32
|- bgcolor=#fcc
| 43
| March 14
| L. A. Lakers
| 
| Jarrett Jack (30)
| Chris Kaman (12)
| Jarrett JackGreivis Vásquez (6)
| New Orleans Arena17,272
| 10–33
|- bgcolor=#fcc
| 44
| March 15
| Washington
| 
| Chris Kaman (20)
| Gustavo Ayon (9)
| Greivis Vásquez (6)
| New Orleans Arena14,256
| 10–34
|- bgcolor=#cfc
| 45
| March 17
| @ New Jersey
| 
| Marco BelinelliChris Kaman (20)
| Gustavo Ayon (9)
| Greivis Vásquez (9)
| Prudential Center11,271
| 11–34
|- bgcolor=#fcc
| 46
| March 21
| Golden State
| 
| Jarrett Jack (17)
| Jarrett Jack (10)
| Jarrett Jack (11)
| New Orleans Arena13,959
| 11–35
|- bgcolor=#cfc
| 47
| March 22
| L. A. Clippers
| 
| Chris Kaman (20)
| Chris Kaman (10)
| Jarrett Jack (9)
| New Orleans Arena17,209
| 12–35
|- bgcolor=#fcc
| 48
| March 24
| San Antonio
| 
| Jarrett Jack (27)
| Gustavo Ayon (13)
| Greivis Vásquez (6)
| New Orleans Arena16,118
| 12–36
|- bgcolor=#fcc
| 49
| March 26
| @ L. A. Clippers
| 
| Al-Farouq Aminu (15)
| Carl Landry (10)
| Jarrett JackGreivis Vásquez (7)
| Staples Center19,060
| 12–37
|- bgcolor=#cfc
| 50
| March 28
| @ Golden State
| 
| Marco Belinelli (22)
| Al-Farouq AminuCarl Landry (8)
| Jarrett Jack (9)
| Oracle Arena18,771
| 13–37
|- bgcolor=#fcc
| 51
| March 29
| @ Portland
| 
| Marco Belinelli (27)
| Jason Smith (9)
| Greivis Vásquez (6)
| Rose Garden20,499
| 13–38
|- bgcolor=#fcc
| 52
| March 31
| @ L. A. Lakers
| 
| Jarrett Jack (18)
| Jason Smith (10)
| Jarrett Jack (10)
| Staples Center18,997
| 13–39

|- bgcolor=#fcc
| 53
| April 1
| @ Phoenix
| 
| Marco BelinelliJason Smith (14)
| Al-Farouq Aminu (8)
| Greivis Vásquez (6)
| US Airways Center15,753
| 13–40
|- bgcolor=#cfc
| 54
| April 4
| Denver
| 
| Trevor ArizaEric Gordon (15)
| Chris Kaman (10)
| Greivis Vásquez (10)
| New Orleans Arena15,020
| 14–40
|- bgcolor=#fcc
| 55
| April 6
| @ San Antonio
| 
| Eric Gordon (31)
| Three players (6)
| Eric Gordon (4)
| AT&T Center18,581
| 14–41
|- bgcolor=#cfc
| 56
| April 7
| Minnesota
| 
| Jason Smith (26)
| Chris KamanJason Smith (10)
| Greivis Vásquez (10)
| New Orleans Arena15,520
| 15–41
|- bgcolor=#fcc
| 57
| April 9
| L. A. Lakers
| 
| Marco Belinelli (20)
| Carl Landry (11)
| Greivis Vásquez (11)
| New Orleans Arena17,275
| 15–42
|- bgcolor=#cfc
| 58
| April 11
| Sacramento
| 
| Jason Smith (22)
| Chris Kaman (10)
| Jerome DysonGreivis Vásquez (5)
| New Orleans Arena16,906
| 16–42
|- bgcolor=#cfc
| 59
| April 13
| Utah
| 
| Eric Gordon (25)
| Jason Smith (8)
| Eric GordonGreivis Vásquez (6)
| New Orleans Arena16,326
| 17–42
|- bgcolor=#cfc
| 60
| April 15
| Memphis
| 
| Eric Gordon (18)
| Carl Landry (11)
| Greivis Vásquez (9)
| New Orleans Arena15,570
| 18–42
|- bgcolor=#cfc
| 61
| April 16
| @ Charlotte
| 
| Greivis Vásquez (20)
| Carl Landry (12)
| Greivis Vásquez (6)
| Time Warner Cable Arena10,876
| 19–42
|- bgcolor=#fcc
| 62
| April 18
| @ Memphis
| 
| Jerome Dyson (24)
| Darryl Watkins (13)
| Greivis Vásquez (9)
| FedExForum14,507
| 19–43
|- bgcolor=#cfc
| 63
| April 19
| Houston
| 
| Eric Gordon (27)
| Carl LandryGustavo Ayon (10)
| Greivis Vásquez (9)
| New Orleans Arena18,315
| 20–43
|- bgcolor=#fcc
| 64
| April 22
| @ L. A. Clippers
| 
| Eric Gordon (17)
| Jason Smith Al-Farouq Aminu (8)
| Greivis Vásquez (7)
| Staples Center19,060
| 20–44
|- bgcolor=#cfc
| 65
| April 24
| @ Golden State
| 
| Marco Belinelli (23)
| Al-Farouq Aminu (11)
| Greivis Vásquez (7)
| Oracle Arena17,598
| 21–44
|- bgcolor=#fcc
| 66
| April 26
| @ Houston
| 
| Jerome Dyson (15)
| Al-Farouq AminuDarryl Watkins (10)
| Greivis Vásquez (6)
| Toyota Center16,602
| 21–45

References

New Orleans Hornets seasons
New Orleans Hornets